Leucoptera astragali is a moth in the family Lyonetiidae that can be  found in Portugal and Tunisia.

The larvae feed on Astragalus lusitanicus. They mine the leaves of their host plant. The mine starts as a blotch, the end of which occupies a large part of the leaflet. The mine is enlarged in a concentric pattern. There is much granular frass, that is glued to the upper epidermis and gives most of the central area of the mine a dark appearance. The full-grown larvae make a semicircular exit slit in the upper epidermis to leave the mine. Pupation takes place within a cocoon.

References

Leucoptera (moth)
Moths described in 1999
Moths of Africa
Moths of Europe